Rianna Loving (born September 13, 1980) is an American beauty product developer and a licensed aesthetician. She is also an entrepreneur and a published writer on beauty, skincare and cosmetics. She is the founder of Organic to Green. She has created brands such as Orgo Beauty, Beauty Cirque and Cirque Boutique, and refillable amenities for airlines and hotel amenities.

Early life 

Loving was born in Burbank, California. She is a former actress.

Acting career 

Loving has been trained in dance, acting, piano, and vocals since she was six years old. At the age of fifteen, she was cast in a local television commercial.

In 1999–2000 Loving portrayed Rianna Miner in the soap opera The Young and the Restless. Other recurring roles included Sabrina in Undressed, Esme in Beverly Hills, 90210, and Jane on The Bold and the Beautiful.  She was also cast to star in a Pepsi commercial alongside Ricky Martin, and had roles on The Andy Dick Show on MTV, American Family on PBS, and Nickelodeon's All That.

Beauty career 
Loving is the founder of the company, Organic to Green, Inc, which was first launched as a Fred Segal brand in 2009 from her kitchen and home lab. She became an advocate for sustainable green lifestyle and trademarked business alliance ReUseCycle, founding the community program ReUse Glass Bottles in Venice, CA, which she founded as a community advocate to bring awareness to reusing glass bottles.  After launching her own brand, she became an advocate for indie brands especially for clean beauty and created Beauty Cirque, a beauty retail boutique. Organic to Green also had a pop-up boutique at the OC Mart Mix. She later introduced Orgo Beauty as a brand within parent company Organic to Green.  From 2013 to 2015, Loving moved Beauty Cirque from the OC Mart Mix to Montana Avenue, Santa Monica. The store was known as Cirque Boutique and included a spa. The Organic to Green brand continued to grow and opened on Main Street, Santa Monica. Loving subsequently opened the second private location in the Abbot Kinney Blvd, Venice.

References

External links 
 

1980 births
Living people